The Red Ghost is a 2021 Russian horror war thriller film directed by Andrei Bogatyryov. In 1941, a detachment of Soviet soldiers, including a dangerous half-man, half-ghost, come up against an elite death squad within the Wehrmacht.

It was theatrically released in Russia on 10 June 2021 by KaroProkat (KaroRental in English).

Plot 
30 December 1941: Leaving the encirclement in the area of the city of Vyazma ("Vyazemsky cauldron") is a small detachment of Soviet soldiers, by fatal coincidence, in an unequal battle with a special unit of the Wehrmacht.

Cast 
 Aleksey Shevchenkov as The Red Ghost
 Vladimir Gostyukhin as Grandfather 
 Yura Borisov as the Simpleton
 Polina Chernyshova as Vera
 Wolfgang Cerny as Braun
 Mikhail Gorevoy as a comic actor 
 Olga Stashkevich as a Red Army woman
 Pavel Abramenkov as a sailor
 Oleg Vasilkov as squad commander
 Yuri Maslak as non-commissioned officer Otto

Production 
The filming process took place in a severe frost in the winter of 2017-2018 in one of the deserted settlements of the Mosalsky District. The scenery for the film was created a year before the start of official filming, but due to inappropriate weather conditions, the work of the film crew had to be postponed for nine months.

References

External links 
 

2021 films
2020s action war films
2020s Christmas horror films
2020s Russian-language films
Russian action war films
Russian action thriller films
Russian historical action films
War epic films
Horror war films
Christmas war films
Russian World War II films
Films set in the Soviet Union
Anti-war films about World War II
2021 thriller films